Ding Dog Daddy is a 1942 Warner Bros. Merrie Melodies cartoon, directed by Friz Freleng and written by Tedd Pierce. The short was released on December 5, 1942.

No voice actors were credited on screen, but those who participated were Pinto Colvig, Mel Blanc and Sara Berner. Gerry Chiniquy was given sole credit as animator, but animators Ken Champin and Manuel Perez were also involved.

The title is a play on a popular expression, coined from the 1928 song "I'm a Ding Dong Daddy from Dumas".

Synopsis 

After having no luck with the ladies, a dim-witted dog (Pinto Colvig, employing his usual "Goofy" voice) falls in love with "Daisy", a metal statue of a female dog in a garden, failing to realize that "Daisy" is indeed a sculpture. Whenever the dog kisses Daisy, lightning strikes and sends a shock through his system, which he takes as a sign of her passionate love for him. The hero constantly has to contend with a vicious bulldog who is guarding the gate to the garden. After Daisy is carted away in a truck marked "Scrap Metal for Victory" to be melted down (as a contribution to the American effort in World War II), the dog runs frantically to the munitions depot, trying to find Daisy, only to find a bomb labelled "Daisy". As he cries over Daisy's changed appearance ("Oh, what have they done to you? They've changed you!"), he kisses "Daisy" and the bomb explodes in his face, leading him to cry out happily. ("WWWWWOOOOWWWWW! Huh Huh! She hasn't changed a bit!")

References

External links
 
 

1942 films
1942 animated films
Short films directed by Friz Freleng
Animated films about dogs
Films scored by Carl Stalling
1940s Warner Bros. animated short films
Merrie Melodies short films